David W. Jones (March 25, 1815 – November 17, 1879) was a politician from the U.S. state of Wisconsin.

Born in Merthyr Tydfil, Wales, he moved to Uniontown, Pennsylvania at two years old with his family. He went to Madison College in Pennsylvania and studied law. Jones moved to Mineral Point, Wisconsin Territory in 1836, where he worked in the land office as clerk and receiver. He then became general paymaster for the Northwest. He then continued to study law and was admitted to the Wisconsin bar. Jones moved to Texas because of his health and then returned to Wisconsin. He died in Joplin, Missouri while returning to Wisconsin.

He served as that state's fifth Secretary of State, serving two terms from January 7, 1856 to January 2, 1860. He was a Democrat and served under Democratic governor William A. Barstow, Democratic acting-governor Arthur MacArthur, Sr., and Republican governors Coles Bashford and Alexander Randall.

He resided in Belmont, Wisconsin at the time of his election.

References 

Secretaries of State of Wisconsin
Wisconsin Democrats
Wisconsin lawyers
Wisconsin Territory officials
1815 births
1879 deaths
People from Uniontown, Pennsylvania
People from Mineral Point, Wisconsin
Welsh emigrants to the United States
19th-century American politicians
People from Belmont, Wisconsin
19th-century American lawyers